Flavio Cipolla and Pavel Šnobel were the defending champions; however, they decided to not compete this year.
Murad Inoyatov and Denis Istomin won the tournament in their country, after defeating Jiří Krkoška and Lukáš Lacko in the final.

Seeds

Draw

Draw

References
 Doubles Draw

Tashkent Challenger - Doubles
2009 Doubles